Kiryat HaMemshala (lit. Government complex), also known as Kiryat Ben-Gurion, (lit. Ben-Gurion complex) is the government precinct of the State of Israel. It is located in the Givat Ram neighborhood of Jerusalem.

History

Before 1948, maps of the area drawn by the Survey of Palestine team tagged its southern part as Karm es Sila, the name indicating that it had once been a karam (vineyard) belonging to a family by the name of Sala (שלה might be originally סלע or سلع), or that the vineyard stood near a stone quarry. The rest of the area belonged to the village of Sheikh Badr.

In December 1949, soon after the establishment of the state, the Israeli cabinet, then headed by David Ben-Gurion, voted to move most of the country's official government institutions from Tel Aviv to Jerusalem.

Construction work began in 1950. The original plans were drawn up by the architectural firms of Munio Gitai Weinraub and Al Mansfeld, but they were not implemented. The complex was designed by architects Richard Kauffmann, Joseph Klarwein and Heinz Rau.

As of today, the Knesset is located in Kiryat HaMemshala, as are the Supreme Court of Israel, the Prime Minister's Office, the Ministry of Foreign Affairs, the Ministry of Interior, the Ministry of Finance, as well as the Bank of Israel.

See also
 Kiryat HaMemshala (East Jerusalem)
 Kiryat Haleom

References

1950 establishments in Israel
Buildings and structures in Jerusalem
20th century in Jerusalem